Jimmy Jatt Amu (born October 15, 1966), professionally referred to by his stage name DJ Jimmy Jatt, is a Nigerian disc jockey who is revered as one of the pioneering [[Afrobeats][hip hop music|hip hop]] DJs in Nigeria. He started out his music career as a rapper under the sobriquet Master J but delved into DJing after his failure in getting signed by a record label despite releasing a handful of songs including a demo recording. He is best known for his Jimmy's Jump Off''' concert, an event he started in 2008 to become one of the most attended entertainment events in Nigeria. In 2006, he won the Hip Hop World Hall of Fame award at the maiden edition of The Headies for his contribution to hip-hop in Nigeria.

Early life and career
Jimmy Amu is a native of Ijebu Ode, Ogun State, but he was born and bred in Lagos Island, Lagos State, Nigeria where he had his basic and secondary education. Born to a father who was a sound equipment dealer, Jimmy Jatt developed interest in music at a tender age. He grew up listening to various genres of music including pop, afrojuju, highlife, afrobeat, jazz, hip-hop, rhythm and blues and soul.
He began his career as a rapper under the stage name Master J but had to switch into DJing after he failed to secure a record label contract upon releasing several songs and demos. He soon became popular as a DJ for hosting a street carnival called "Road Block", an event which involved lyrical rap battles between upcoming and underground rappers. In 2007, he released a mixtape titled The Definition, a compilation of songs which features several Nigerian artistes including Sound Sultan, 2Baba, Mode 9, Naeto C, 9ice, Ruggedman, eLDee, M.I among others. The mixtape included "Stylee", a song which features vocals from 2Baba, Mode 9 and ElaJoe and went on to be nominated in two categories at the 2007 edition of the Channel O Music Video Awards. With a T.V programme called Jimmy's Jump Off, several collaborations, awards and nominations and endorsement deals; DJ Jimmy Jatt is highly recognised and revered for pushing hip-hop in Nigeria.

Discography
Studio albumsThe Definition (2007)The Industry Vol 1 (2014)Urban Heartbeat'' (2017)

References

External links

1966 births
Living people
People from Ijebu Ode
Musicians from Ogun State
Nigerian hip hop DJs
Nigerian hip hop musicians
African DJs